Pamela Rosado (born 30 April 1986) is a Puerto Rican basketball player for Montañeras de Morovis and the Puerto Rican national team.

She participated at the 2018 FIBA Women's Basketball World Cup. and at the 2020 Summer Olympic Games which were held during 2021 instead because of the Covid-19 outbreak of 2020.

References

External links

1986 births
Living people
Basketball players at the 2019 Pan American Games
Basketball players at the 2020 Summer Olympics
Olympic basketball players of Puerto Rico
Pan American Games medalists in basketball
Point guards
People from Arecibo, Puerto Rico
Puerto Rican women's basketball players
Pan American Games bronze medalists for Puerto Rico
Medalists at the 2019 Pan American Games